Fatoua is a genus of 3 species of herbs in the mulberry family.

Species
Fatoua villosa
Fatoua pilosa
Fatoua madagascariensis

Bibliography

Moraceae genera
Moraceae